The Colloquium Balticum is a conference series of Northern European classicists who study Greek and Latin antiquity and its reception mainly in the Baltic region. The conferences are organized annually by the members of the Baltic Network of Classical Scholars. As of 2007, the network includes University of Greifswald and University of Marburg (Germany), University of Lund (Sweden), University of Latvia, University of Tartu (Estonia), Vilnius University (Lithuania), and Saint Petersburg State University (Russia).

Past conferences 
 Colloquium Balticum I – Lund 2001
 Colloquium Balticum II – Greifswald 2002
 Colloquium Balticum III – Lund 2003
 Colloquium Balticum IV – Riga 2004
 Colloquium Balticum V – Lund 2005
 Colloquium Balticum VI – Greifswald 2006
 Colloquium Balticum VII – Tartu 2007
 Colloquium Balticum VIII – Vilnius 2008
 Colloquium Balticum IX – Riga 2010
 Colloquium Balticum X – Vilnius 2011
 Colloquium Balticum XI – Lund 2012
 Colloquium Balticum XII – Marburg 2013
 Colloquium Balticum XIII – Riga 2014
 Colloquium Balticum XIV – Tartu 2015
 Colloquium Balticum XV – Vilnius 2016
 Colloquium Balticum XVI – Lund 2018
 Colloquium Balticum XVII – Marburg 2019
 Colloquium Balticum XVIII – Vilnius 2021

References

External links 
 Colloquium Balticum home page 
 Colloquium Balticum mailing list

Classical studies
21st-century conferences